Mihaela Ani Senocico (born 1981) is a Romanian handball player, who plays for CS Măgura Cisnădie.

With the Romanian national team she participated at the 2008 Summer Olympics in Beijing, where the Romanian team placed seventh.

References

External links

1981 births
Living people
Sportspeople from Bistrița
Romanian female handball players 
Olympic handball players of Romania
SCM Râmnicu Vâlcea (handball) players

Handball players at the 2008 Summer Olympics
21st-century Romanian women